In differential geometry, a caustic is the envelope of rays either reflected or refracted by a manifold. It is related to the concept of caustics in geometric optics. The ray's source may be a point (called the radiant) or parallel rays from a point at infinity, in which case a direction vector of the rays must be specified.

Explanation

Concentration of light, especially sunlight, can burn. The word caustic, in fact, comes from the Greek καυστός, burnt, via the Latin causticus, burning.

A common situation where caustics are visible is when light shines on a drinking glass. The glass casts a shadow, but also produces a curved region of bright light. In ideal circumstances (including perfectly parallel rays, as if from a point source at infinity), a nephroid-shaped patch of light can be produced. Rippling caustics are commonly formed when light shines through waves on a body of water.

Another familiar caustic is the rainbow. Scattering of light by raindrops causes different wavelengths of light to be refracted into arcs of differing radius, producing the bow.

Catacaustic
A catacaustic is the reflective case.

With a radiant, it is the evolute of the orthotomic of the radiant.

Having components of found reflected vector treat it as a tangent

Using the simplest envelope form
 

Cramer's rule would serve.

Example
Let the direction vector be (0,1) and the mirror be 
Then
               

and  has solution ; i.e., light entering a parabolic mirror parallel to its axis is reflected through the focus.

See also
 Cut locus (Riemannian manifold)
 Last geometric statement of Jacobi
 Nephroid caustic

References

External links

Differential geometry